Hamed Habib Sadeq (born 18 December 1971) is a former Kuwaiti sprinter who competed in the men's 100m competition at the 1996 Summer Olympics. He recorded a 10.81, not enough to qualify for the next round past the heats. His personal best is 10.36, set the same year.

References

1971 births
Living people
Kuwaiti people of Iranian descent
Kuwaiti male sprinters
Athletes (track and field) at the 1996 Summer Olympics
Olympic athletes of Kuwait